Andrea Bellini may refer to:

Andrea Bellini (singer), Italian opera singer
Andrea Bellini (curator) (born 1971), Italian contemporary art curator